Fish Branch is a stream in Audrain County in the U.S. state of Missouri.

Fish Branch was so named for the creek's abundance of fish.

See also
List of rivers of Missouri

References

Rivers of Audrain County, Missouri
Rivers of Missouri